Garrett Ross Sickels (born September 24, 1994) is a former American football outside linebacker. He played college football at Penn State, and signed as an undrafted free agent with Indianapolis Colts the in 2017. He played for three seasons, signing with four teams.

High school career
Sickels played all four years at Red Bank Regional High School, but didn't see significant playing time until his junior year playing mostly special teams his first two years. He recorded 194 tackles, 25 sacks, nine forced fumbles and eight blocked kicks in his career. Selected to play in the 2013 U.S. Army All-American game, where he roomed with future Nittany Lion teammate Brendan Mahon. Rated a four-star recruit by ESPN.com, Rivals.com and Scout.com and was the Rivals.com No. 3 overall prep player in New Jersey.

College career
Sickles arrived at Penn State in 2013 but redshirted his true freshman season. Sickles racked up over 90 tackles, 29 of which were tackles for loss or no gain. Sickles best performance was on October 22, 2016, when he had 9 tackles including 2.5 sacks vs Ohio State. After his junior season he was named to Phil Steele's and the Athlon Sports All-Big Ten third-team, Selected All-Big Ten second-team by the conference coaches and All-Big Ten third-team by the media panel. Named Most Valuable Defensive Player at the annual Nittany Lion Football Banquet.

On January 4, 2017, Sickles declared for the 2017 NFL Draft.

Statistics

Professional career

Indianapolis Colts
After going undrafted in the 2017 NFL Draft, Sickels signed with the Indianapolis Colts on May 3, 2017. He was waived on September 2, 2017 and was signed to the Colts' practice squad the next day. He was released on September 12, 2017.

Cleveland Browns
On September 25, 2017, Sickels was signed to the Cleveland Browns' practice squad. He was released on October 3, 2017.

Los Angeles Rams
On October 12, 2017, Sickels was signed to the Los Angeles Rams' practice squad. He was promoted to the active roster on December 27, 2017.

On August 4, 2018, Sickels was waived/injured by the Rams and placed on injured reserve. Without Sickels, the Rams reached Super Bowl LIII where they lost 13-3 to the New England Patriots.

Washington Redskins
On August 1, 2019, Sickels was signed by the Washington Redskins. He was waived with an injury settlement on August 11, 2019.

Sickles announced his retirement from football on August 27, 2019.

References

External links
Penn State Nittany Lions bio

1994 births
Living people
Players of American football from New Jersey
Sportspeople from Monmouth County, New Jersey
American football linebackers
American football defensive ends
People from Red Bank, New Jersey
Red Bank Regional High School alumni
Penn State Nittany Lions football players
Indianapolis Colts players
Cleveland Browns players
Los Angeles Rams players
Washington Redskins players